Vacquières is a commune in the Hérault department in the Occitanie region in southern France. J-B Cavalier produces an organic white wine here.

Population

See also
Communes of the Hérault department

References

Communes of Hérault